is a Japanese politician of the Democratic Party of Japan, who is a former member of the House of Councillors in the Diet (national legislature) from the Saitama at-large district. A native of Fukuoka Prefecture and graduate of Saga Women's Junior College and Meikai University, she was elected for the first time in 2003.

References

External links 
  in Japanese.

Members of the House of Councillors (Japan)
Female members of the House of Councillors (Japan)
Japanese dentists
Politicians from Fukuoka Prefecture
Living people
1962 births
Democratic Party of Japan politicians